The following is a list of all team-to-team transactions that have occurred in the National Hockey League during the 1970–71 NHL season. It lists what team each player has been traded to, signed by, or claimed by, and for which player(s) or draft pick(s), if applicable.

Trades

May

 Trade completed on June 10, 1970.

June

August

September

October

November

December

January

February

 Trade completed on May 12, 1971.

March

Expansion Draft 

The 1970–71 NHL season saw the entrance of a 13th and 14th team to the league, the Buffalo Sabres and Vancouver Canucks. Each team selected 20 players from across the league, for a total of 40 selections.

Additional sources
 hockeydb.com - search for player and select "show trades"
 

Transactions
National Hockey League transactions